The 1927 Capital Football season was the second Capital Football season.

1927 FCTSA League
The 1927 FCTSA League is the second season of the FCTSA League, the former top Australian professional soccer league in the Capital Football.

Teams
 Burns
 Canberra
 Molonglo
 Queanbeyan

League table

Results

Finals Series

Semi-final

Grand Final

References

External links
 Official website

Federal